Paolo Caccia Dominioni, born in Nerviano, Lombardy, 14th Baron of Sillavengo (14 May 1896 – 12 August 1992); was an Italian soldier; officer in Alpini mountain Infantry Corps; engineer and writer, most noted for his leadership in the North Africa Campaign in World War II.

Biography 
Paolo Caccia Dominioni was born on May 14, 1896, in Nerviano, Milan, Kingdom of Italy. He was the son of Carlo (seventeenth count of Sillavengo; a diplomat) and Bianca (a marquise; maiden name, Cusani-Confalonieni).

In 1913 he entered the Faculty of Engineering at the Royal High Polytechnical School of Milan. In 1915, when Italy joined World War I, he registered as a volunteer. He fought in the Alpini Corps, where he was commissioned a first lieutenant. In February 1920, he re-entered the Polytechnical School. He earned his doctorate in Civil Engineering in 1922. 

From 1924 onwards, Caccia Dominioni worked mainly abroad. During his engineer's career in prewar Egypt, he developed a deep friendship with the Belgian expatriate Vladimir Peniakoff, later to be known as Popski (the creator and leader of a World War II Special Forces unit called Popski's Private Army ("No 1 Demolition Squadron, PPA") with whom he had explored the Egyptian desert; a few years later the two friends would be facing each other as enemies, in Libya, in World War II. In 1931, Caccia Dominioni undertook a topographical survey of Tripolitania and in 1935 he led a reconnaissance campaign in Sudan.

In 1935–6 Caccia Dominioni fought in the Second Italo-Ethiopian War. At the outbreak of World War II he was first assigned to Military Intelligence (Servizio Informazioni Militare). In June 1942 he was given command of the 31st Engineer Assault Battalion and participated in the El Alamein battles in November 1942. Field Marshall Erwin Rommel personally awarded him the Iron Cross, 2nd Class for his actions during the First Battle of El Alamein.

After the armistice he joined the Italian resistance movement. In July 1944 he was arrested by the National Republican Guard, but released shortly afterward. His book on the Italian Campaign in North Africa, Alamein 1933–1962, was translated into English and published by Allen & Unwin in 1966 as Alamein 1933–1962: An Italian Story. 

On May 7, 1958 Caccia Dominioni married Elena Sciolette (an amateur archaeologist).  They had two daughters: Bianca Ottavia and Anna Francesca.

Caccia Dominioni devoted his postwar career to the retrieving of soldiers' corpses still on the Alamein battlefield and to the design and construction of a cemetery and a memorial building, located on a particular spot on the Alamein battleground named "Hill 33" where – thanks to his twenty years of efforts – thousands of Italian, German and British unknown fallen soldiers, were eventually identified and received a proper burial.

Dominioni also designed the Italian National Ossario in Murchison, Australia. The ossario holds the remains of 130 Italian prisoners of war and interned civilians who died in while interned in Australia during World War II.

Caccia Dominioni was correspondent for the Italian newspaper Il Corriere della Sera (1931-61), and contributor to other Italian and French newspapers. He died on August 12, 1992 in Rome, Lazio, Italy.

Works 
 
 
 
 
 
 
 
 Le trecento ore a Nord di Qattara (anthology on the Battle of El Alamein), Longanesi, 1972.

Works translated into English

Bibliography  
 
 
 
 
 Migliaccio, Maria Concetta, “Caccia Dominioni, Paolo,” in Ezio Godoli and Milva Giacomelli (eds.), Architetti e ingegneri italiani dal Levante al Maghreb, 1848-1945: repertorio biografico, bibliografico e archivistico, Florence: Maschietto Editore, 2005, p. 109‒113;
 Scaramuzzi, Armando, “The Egypt of Paolo Caccia Dominioni,” in Ezio Godoli and Milva Giacomelli (eds.), Italian Architects and Engineers in Egypt from the Nineteenth to the Twentyfirst Century, Exhibition Catalogue (Alexandria, Biblioteca Alessandrina, 24 october-25 november 2008), Florence: Maschietto Editore, 2008, p. 184‒195;
 Scaramuzzi, Armando, “Le ‘Grand tour’ de Paolo Caccia Dominioni,” in Silvia Finzi, Milva Giacomelli, Ezio Godoli and Ahmed Saadaoui (eds.), Architectures et architectes italiens au Maghreb: actes du colloque international tenu aux Archives nationales de Tunisie, Tunis, 10-12 décembre 2009, Florence: Polistampa, 2011 (Les chemins de l’architecture italienne dans le monde), p. 144‒149;
 Pallini, Cristina, “Architecture of Engineers: Paolo Caccia Dominioni before El Alamein (1924-1938),” in Milva Giacomelli, Ezio Godoli and Ulisse Tramonti (eds.) Italian Architectural and Artistic Heritage in Egypt. Documentation & Safeguard: proceedings of the first international seminar, Cairo, Italian Culture Institute, November 28th, 2015, Alexandria, El Horya Ibedaa Center, November 30th, December 1st, 2015, Arcidosso (Grosseto): Effigi Edizioni, 2017 (Italian architectural and artistic heritage in mediterranean countries. Documentation and preservation), p. 199‒217.

References

External links 

 
 

1896 births
1992 deaths
People from the Province of Milan
Italian soldiers
20th-century Italian engineers
Italian resistance movement members
Italian male writers
Recipients of the Silver Medal of Military Valor
Officers Crosses of the Order of Merit of the Federal Republic of Germany
Italian stamp designers